Bolts is an album by Kevin Gilbert, which was released posthumously in 2009.  It is a collection of unreleased material from Gilbert's career, which was released simultaneously with Nuts.

Track listing
 "Waking The Sun" - 3:44 	
 "Jenny Ledge" (Acoustic) - 4:44 	
 "Something Nice for My Dog" - 3:16 	
 "Souvenir" - 4:06 	
 "God's Been Tapping My Phone" - 3:54 	
 "Goodness Gracious" (Acoustic) - 3:57 	
 "The Best of Everything" - 4:58 	
 "Blank Page" - 2:23 	
 "Taxi Ride" - 4:07 	
 "Lonely Road"  - 5:25 	
 "Finale" - 1:53

Personnel
Kevin Gilbert – vocals, guitar, bass, piano, keyboards, programming, sequencing
Nick D'Virgilio – percussion on "Something Nice For My Dog" and "Goodness Gracious"

References

External links
Bolts review at prognaut.com

2009 albums
Kevin Gilbert albums
Albums published posthumously